Luther Marcellus Goddard (October 27, 1840 – May 20, 1917) was an associate justice of the Colorado Supreme Court from 1891 to 1901 and from 1905 to 1909.

Education and early career
Goddard was born in Palmyra, New York and went to elementary school there. His family moved to Abingdon, Illinois, where he completed his secondary schooling. In 1862, he moved to Leavenworth, Kansas and began to read law, then enrolling in the University of Chicago Law School in 1864. He graduated in 1865 and was named class valedictorian. He was admitted to the bar soon after graduating and then returned to Leavenworth.

In Leavenworth, Goddard served for two years as deputy county attorney, then he was elected county attorney for two terms. In fall 1871, he was elected to serve in the Kansas legislature.

Career in Colorado
Goddard moved to Leadville, Colorado in 1878. There, he became involved in the mining industry and also practiced law. In 1882 and 1888, he was elected and re-elected judge of the 5th Judicial District.

An attempt was made to remove Goddard from his district court seat through disbarment. He was accused of agreeing to accept a campaign contribution in return for appointing the donor clerk of the court if he were elected. The court ruled in favor of Goddard.

In 1892, the Populist and Democratic parties nominated him as their candidate for the Colorado Supreme Court Justice, and he was elected, serving until his term ended in 1901. While serving on the court this term, Goddard was one of the three justices that heard the Courvoisier v. Raymond case, a case that involved mistaken self-defense. During this period he moved to Denver.

In 1905, the Supreme Court was reorganized, and Governor Peabody appointed Goddard to serve a second term on the court. Soon after he began serving his second Supreme Court term, a bomb was placed at his Denver residence, but it didn't go off.

Death
Goddard died May 20, 1917, in Denver, age 79. He's buried in Denver's Riverside Cemetery.

References

Justices of the Colorado Supreme Court
1840 births
1917 deaths
People from Palmyra, New York
People from Denver
University of Chicago Law School alumni
People from Leadville, Colorado
Colorado lawyers
Members of the Kansas House of Representatives
19th-century American judges
19th-century American lawyers